Wedagedara Sadeera Rashen Samarawickrama (born 30 August 1995) is a professional Sri Lankan cricketer who represents the national team in all formats of the game. He was part of Sri Lanka's squad for the 2014 ICC Under-19 Cricket World Cup. He is a past pupil of St. Josephs College, Colombo.

Domestic career
He made the most runs in the 2016–17 Premier League Tournament, with a total of 1,016 from 10 matches and 19 innings. In November 2017, he was named the best batsman in domestic cricket for the 2016–17 season at Sri Lanka Cricket's annual awards.

In March 2018, he was named in Galle's squad for the 2017–18 Super Four Provincial Tournament. The following month, he was also named in Galle's squad for the 2018 Super Provincial One Day Tournament.

In August 2018, he was named in Dambulla's squad the 2018 SLC T20 League. In February 2019, in the first day of the 2018–19 SLC Twenty20 Tournament, Samarawickrama scored an unbeaten century for Colts Cricket Club against Police Sports Club. In March 2019, he was named in Kandy's squad for the 2019 Super Provincial One Day Tournament. In August 2021, he was named in the SLC Blues team for the 2021 SLC Invitational T20 League tournament. In July 2022, he was signed by the Jaffna Kings for the third edition of the Lanka Premier League.

International career
Samarawickrama was part of the Sri Lankan team in the ACC Emerging Teams Asia Cup 2017 tournament. He scored 45 runs in the final to win the low scoring match against Pakistan. This was the first time that Sri Lanka went onto win the tournament.

In September 2017, he was named in Sri Lanka's Test squad for their series against Pakistan in the United Arab Emirates. He made his Test debut for Sri Lanka against Pakistan on 6 October 2017 in Sri Lanka's first day-night Test match. In the first innings, he scored 38 runs and had a swift 68-run stand with centurion Dimuth Karunaratne. His inside-out drives to Yasir Shah was described similar to that of maestro Mahela Jayawardena's stroke play by critics.

In October 2017, he was named in Sri Lanka's One Day Internationals (ODI) squad for their series against Pakistan in the United Arab Emirates. He made his ODI debut for Sri Lanka against Pakistan on 20 October 2017. He was dismissed for nought in both matches, becoming the third batsman after Sachin Tendulkar and Kane Williamson to dismissed for nought in first two ODIs.

Later the same month, he was named in Sri Lanka's Twenty20 International (T20I) squad for their series also against Pakistan. He made his T20I debut for Sri Lanka against Pakistan on 26 October 2017, keeping wicket in the match.

In May 2018, he was one of 33 cricketers to be awarded a national contract by Sri Lanka Cricket ahead of the 2018–19 season. In June 2022, he was named in the Sri Lanka A squad for their matches against Australia A during Australia's tour of Sri Lanka.

References

External links
 

1995 births
Living people
Sri Lankan cricketers
Sri Lanka Test cricketers
Sri Lanka One Day International cricketers
Sri Lanka Twenty20 International cricketers
Cricketers from Colombo
Colombo Commandos cricketers
Colts Cricket Club cricketers
Kegalle District cricketers
Wicket-keepers